Roskell is a surname. Notable people with the surname include:

George Bernard Roskell (1850–1926) Australian architect 
J. S. Roskell (1913–1998), English historian
Luke Roskell (born 1997), English actor 
Richard Roskell (1817–1883), English Roman Catholic Bishop
Scott Roskell (born 1969), Australian former rugby league footballer

See also
Roskill (disambiguation)